The Young Film Academy (YFA), based in London, is an English educational institution and the educational sister company to Magma Pictures. The academy is the UK's leading provider of practical filmmaking programs to young people aged 8–18. YFA works with over 80 of the UK's leading independent and state schools with their flagship programs, the "One Day Film School". YFA is also the workshop provider for UK arts festivals, including the Guardian Hay Festival and The Edinburgh International Film Festival, The Minghella Film Festival, The High Tide Festival ,and the Barbican's London Children's Film Festival.

History 
Directors James Walker (writer/filmmaker) and Ed Boase co-founded Young Film Academy in 2004. Today, Young Film Academy (YFA) provides to young people aged 6–19 filmmaking courses, school filmmaking programs, community filmmaking projects, filmmaking outreach events and kids film parties.

Based in London, YFA also works internationally to help over 7,500 young people each year complete their first digital films, including West End-premiered movies and curriculum-linked film projects in schools.

Young Film Academy is a hub partner in the British Film Institute (BFI) Film Academy Network helping to find top UK emerging talent. YFA designs and delivers educational film projects for the UKʼs largest arts institutions but also helps small groups of kids who just want to make movies as a hobby or host filmmaking parties at home.

Programs of study
Young Film Academy provides several types of filmmaking workshops and products including:

Residential summer camps
Day courses
Extended courses
Weekend courses and clubs
Online and remote courses
Single day film programs for schools
Advanced workshops for schools
Prospectus films for schools 
Rough cut workshop
Filmmaking parties for youth
Star-in music video or film parties

Media coverage 
Young Film Academy has been featured positively in several publications. Website IOM Today wrote, "The academy is seen as an investment in the future of British film,"<ref>[http://www.iomtoday.co.im/schools-news/Young-Film-Academy-workshop-at.4500498.jp Young Film Academy workshop at King William's College IOM Today] 17 Sept. 2008]</ref> and TimeOut London'' wrote, "Ed Boase and James Walker have come up with an exciting party concept: kids shoot, edit and screen a film in a single day. Its success boils down to a combination of talent and teamwork."  .

References

External links 
 Young Film Academy
 Magma Pictures
 One Day Film School
 MovieParties
 Genie Film
 Short Film Horsepower
 Monkey Movies

Educational institutions established in 2004
2004 establishments in England